Bishops Park College was a comprehensive school located in Clacton-on-Sea, Essex. It is now officially combined with Colbayns High School. The two have been renamed Clacton Coastal Academy.

History
Bishops Park College opened in 2002. The school was placed on special measures in 2007 but in 2009 the school received a positive Ofsted inspection.

See also
List of schools in Essex

References

External links
Bishops Park College

Defunct schools in Essex
Educational institutions established in 2002
2002 establishments in England
Educational institutions disestablished in 2009
2009 disestablishments in England